Dilara Narin (born 17 March 2002) is a Turkish weightlifter. She won the gold medal in the women's 81 kg event at the 2021 Islamic Solidarity Games held in Konya, Turkey. She won the bronze medal in the women's 81 kg event at the 2022 European Weightlifting Championships held in Tirana, Albania.

Career 
She won the gold medal in the girls' +63kg event at the 2018 Summer Youth Olympics held in Buenos Aires, Argentina. At the time, she won the silver medal but Supatchanin Khamhaeng of Thailand was stripped of her gold medal after testing positive for a banned substance.

She won the gold medal in her event at the 2022 Junior World Weightlifting Championships held in Heraklion, Greece. She won the bronze medal in the women's 81 kg event at the 2022 European Weightlifting Championships held in Tirana, Albania. She won the gold medal in the women's 81 kg event at the 2021 Islamic Solidarity Games held in Konya, Turkey.

Achievements

References

External links 
 

Living people
2002 births
Turkish female weightlifters
Weightlifters at the 2018 Summer Youth Olympics
Youth Olympic gold medalists for Turkey
European Weightlifting Championships medalists
Islamic Solidarity Games competitors for Turkey
Islamic Solidarity Games medalists in weightlifting
21st-century Turkish women